The University College of Engineering, Kakatiya University is a public engineering institute located in Kothagudem, India. Formerly known as the Kothagudem School of Mines (KSM). It is the first mining college in Telangana and the second in India.

History
The first of all UCE, UCE(KU)] erstwhile KSM, started functioning in 1956 with single department Mining Engineering.
Established in 1976, the University College of Engineering, Kakatiya University, is the oldest institution for mining in Telangana. It was formerly known as Kothagudem School of Mines, originally established under osmania University. It was later made a college under Kakatiya University under which many names were changed for the institute now settling with the name University college of engineering.

The college moved to its present permanent building in 1996( except the mining department).  Today it is the biggest among the campus colleges of Kakatiya University. There are 103 non teaching staff members, and around 20 regular professors. The college offers undergraduate  B.Tech in CSE, EEE, Mining ECE, IT courses.

Academics
The college admits undergraduate students through the statewide EAMCET exam conducted every year. It offers Bachelor of Engineering (BE) courses in multiple disciplines.

Departments
 Computer Science and Engineering
 Electrical and Electronics Engineering 
 Mining Engineering
 Information Technology
 Electronics and Communication Engineering

Computer Science and Engineering 
Kakatiya University embarked in 1996 on the Computer Science and Engineering Programme, when the UGC identified the University for its manpower development Programme. The Department offers B.E. and MCA programs.

Placement Cell for Computer Science and Engineering 
Students are placed in companies like CA Inc., Teradata, Infosys, Syntel, Mahindra Satyam, Accenture

Electrical and Electronics Engineering 
The department started in 1996 as a part of the Electrical Engineering Department. The department has the following labs.
1. Basic Electrical Lab
2. Electrical Machines
3. Power Systems
4. Digital Electronics
5. Control Systems

Mining Engineering 
The Mining Engineering Department was established in 1957 at Osmania University, Hyderabad, to offer a four-year degree course in Mining Engineering, with an intake of 30 students.  This is the only mining department in Telangana. Students of mining will be taken to  mine surveys and mine visits .

The department has established the following laboriousness for practical training:
 Rock Mechanics Lab
 Mine ventilation Lab
 Mine surveying Lab
 Mine environment Hazards
 Strength of Materials
 Mechanical Technology
 CAD/CAM lab with 30 computers
 Rock Excavation Lab
 survey
The department faculty members are on National Committees as well as in mining projects in the region. The department has organized eleven National Seminars/Conferences/Workshops/Short-term programs in areas such as CAD/CAM, stress analysis using FEM, Optimization of energy, Recovery systems and metal spinning.

References

Engineering colleges in Telangana
Schools of mines in India
Educational institutions established in 1957
1957 establishments in Andhra Pradesh